The São Tomé and Príncipe national football team is the national association football team of São Tomé and Príncipe and is controlled by the São Toméan Football Federation. It is a member of the Confederation of African Football (CAF) and FIFA.

History
São Tomé and Príncipe's first ever match was a friendly against Gabon in May 1976. They lost by a score of 6–1. Their next game, during the 1976 Central African Games, was a horrendous 11–0 loss to Congo, São Tomé's largest loss to date. São Tomé rounded off the competition with a 2–1 loss to Central African Republic and a 5–0 loss to Chad.

The following year, São Tomé picked up their first win, in a friendly versus Rwanda. In both 1978 and 1987 they achieved a draw at home to Angola.

The Green and Yellows took an eleven year break, before a string of matches including their first entry to a FIFA sanctioned tournament. At the UNIFAC Cup in 1999, they achieved their second win, 2–0 against Equatorial Guinea. They won the next game after that, against Sierra Leone, 2–0. This two-in-a-row streak accompanied with a draw a few matches later placed them at their highest FIFA ranking to date, 179.

In 2003, São Tomé lost to Libya 1–0 and 8–0, which was a major blow to their previous success. São Tomé did not participate in the qualification for the 2010 World Cup, withdrawing before their first match, leaving them unranked in the FIFA rankings because they did not play any matches for four years.

On 11 November 2011, after an eight-year hiatus, São Tomé and Príncipe participated in the qualification for the 2014 World Cup, losing to Congo 5–0, then drawing 1–1 with the same team four days later. São Tomé were reinstated in the FIFA rankings on 23 November 2011, entering at number 192.

In January 2012, in the preliminary round of 2013 AFCON Qualifiers, São Tomé achieved their first ever aggregate win, defeating Lesotho 1–0 at home then successfully defending a 0–0 draw in Maseru seven days later. In the next round, São Tomé only narrowly lost 5–4 on aggregate to Sierra Leone. In the following years, São Tomé continued to show promise with impressive wins at home to Ethiopia and Libya but poor away results prevented them from advancing again.

On 9 October 2019, São Tomé defeated Mauritius 1–3 away from home in the first leg of their preliminary round tie of 2021 AFCON Qualifiers. This was São Tomé and Príncipe's first away win in a competitive match ever. Four days later, São Tomé won 2–1 at home to advance 5–2 on aggregate and enter Group C, facing Ghana, South Africa and Sudan, where they finished bottom with zero points.

During the 2023 AFCON qualifiers, São Tomé faced Mauritius, winning the first leg 1–0 before drawing the second leg 3–3 to advance to the group stages. Following the fixtures CAF sanctioned São Tomé for their first leg victory as they hadn't followed COVID protocol for Luis Leal, giving Mauritius a 3–0 victory and eliminating São Tomé from the competition. São Tomé appealed the decision and, following an initial unsuccessful ruling, they were reinstated by CAF a week before the first qualifying group game.

Results and fixtures

2022

2023

Coaching history

 Rudi Gutendorf (1984)
 Juvenal Correia (1998)
 Eduardo de Sousa (2000)
 Antônio Dumas (2000–2001)
 Jose Ferraz (2003–2005)
 Osvaldo Lima (2011)
 Gustave Clément Nyoumba (2011–2015)
 António do Rosário (2015–2017)
 Gustave Clément Nyoumba (2017–2019)
 Adriano Eusébio (2019–present)

Players

Current squad
The following players were called up for the 2023 AFCON qualification matches against Sierra Leone on 22 and 26 March 2023.

Caps and goals correct as of: 13 June 2022, after the match against

Recent call ups

Player records

Players in bold are still active with São Tomé and Príncipe.

Competition records

World Cup record

Africa Cup of Nations record

Head-to-head record

References

 
African national association football teams